Hard Bargain may refer to:

 Hard Bargain (Albert King album), 1996
 Hard Bargain (Emmylou Harris album), 2011
 Hard Bargain (Burn Notice), an episode of Burn Notice
 Hard Bargain (Charlottesville, Virginia), a historic home
 Hard Bargain, the capital of Moore's Island, Bahamas
 Hardbargin, a town in Trinidad